A manifold is a wide and/or bigger pipe, or channel, into which smaller pipes or channels lead.
A pipe fitting or similar device that connects multiple inputs or outputs.

Manifolds

In Engineering

Types of manifolds in engineering include:

Exhaust manifold
An engine part that collects the exhaust gases from multiple cylinders into one pipe. Also known as headers.
Hydraulic manifold
A component used to regulate fluid flow in a hydraulic system, thus controlling the transfer of power between actuators and pumps
Inlet manifold (or "intake manifold")
An engine part that supplies the air or fuel/air mixture to the cylinders
Scuba manifold
In a scuba set, connects two or more diving cylinders
Vacuum gas manifold
An apparatus used in chemistry to manipulate gases

Also, many dredge pipe pieces.

In Biology

In biology manifolds are found in:

 Cardiovascular system (blood vessel manifolds, etc.)
 Lymphatic system
 Respiratory system

In other fields

Manifolds are used in:
 Pipe organ

References

Fluid mechanics